Said Hasan was an Indo-Fijian lawyer and politician. He served in the Legislative Council between 1937 and 1944.

Biography
Hasan was born in Amritsar Punjab Province in British India and earned a BA at Punjab University. He then moved to the United Kingdom and read law at Gray's Inn and studied for an LLB at the University of London. He was called to the bar in 1915.

After a spell of travelling, Hasan returned to India and worked at the Punjab High Court, as well as lecturing at the University Law College where he became its Vice Principal. He subsequently moved to Zanzibar, where he lived until moving to Fiji for a year in 1931. He then returned to India, before moving back to Fiji in 1934, where he earned a reputation as one of the best lawyers in the country.

In 1936 Hasan was appointed to the Suva Town Board, and the following year he was appointed to the Legislative Council. He also became President of the Fiji Muslim League.

References

Alumni of the University of London
Members of Gray's Inn
20th-century Indian lawyers
Indian lecturers
Indian emigrants to Fiji
20th-century Fijian lawyers
Fijian Muslims
Members of the Legislative Council of Fiji